The 1987 du Maurier Classic was contested from July 9–12 at Islesmere Golf Club in Laval, Quebec. It was the edition 15th of the du Maurier Classic, and the ninth edition as a major championship on the LPGA Tour.

This event was won by Jody Rosenthal.

Final leaderboard

External links
 Golf Observer source

Canadian Women's Open
Sport in Laval, Quebec
du Maurier Classic
du Maurier Classic
du Maurier Classic